The Merchant Marine Meritorious Service Medal is a decoration of the United States Merchant Marine.  It is awarded to any seamen of any ship operated by or for the War Shipping Administration who is commended by the Administrator for conduct or service of a meritorious nature, but not sufficient to warrant the Merchant Marine Distinguished Service Medal.  Regulations state that not more than one medal shall be issued to any one seaman, but for each succeeding instance sufficient to justify the award of a medal, there will be awarded a suitable insignia to be worn with the medal.

As the Merchant Marine Meritorious Service Medal is considered a federal service decoration, it may be worn on the uniforms of active, reserve and retired uniformed service members.

Design Notes 
Designed by Paul Manship, subsequent awards of the medal are represented by 5/16th inch gold stars affixed to both the suspension ribbon and the ribbon bar.

See also 
Awards and decorations of the United States government
 Awards and decorations of the United States Maritime Administration
 Awards and decorations of the United States Merchant Marine
 Awards and decorations of the United States military

External links
 Laws Establishing Merchant Marine Medals

Awards and decorations of the United States Merchant Marine
Awards established in 1944
Works by Paul Manship